Pah-Ute County is a former county in the northwest corner of Arizona Territory that existed from 1865 until 1871, at which point most of the area was transferred to Nevada. The remainder was merged into Mohave County. The majority of the territory is now in Clark County, Nevada, which includes the city of Las Vegas.  Due to the transfer of most of the county's land to Nevada, Pah-Ute is sometimes referred to as Arizona's "Lost County".  Pah-Ute is an historic spelling of the tribal name Paiute.

History
Pah-Ute county was created on December 22, 1865 by an act of the 2nd Arizona Territorial Legislature from the northern part of Mohave County following the sponsorship of Representative Octavius Gass.  Created to meet the needs of a rapidly growing population of farmers along the Colorado River, the county seat was initially Callville. The county seat was moved to the Mormon community of St. Thomas on October 1, 1867.  (Both communities are now located at the bottom of Lake Mead.)  Initial boundaries of the county were those parts of Arizona Territory north of the Roaring Rapids on the Colorado River and west of 113° 20” west longitude.

On May 5, 1866, the United States Congress approved legislation transferring the portions of Pah-Ute and Mohave counties west of the Colorado River and west of 114 degrees west longitude to the state of Nevada.  The assignment took effect on January 18, 1867.  The Arizona Territory lodged multiple protests with Congress and attempted for several years to have the transfer reversed, but was unable to overturn the change of possession.  During this time, Pah-Ute county continued to have representation in the Arizona Territorial Legislature through 1868.  Official dissolution of Pah-Ute county occurred on February 18, 1871 when the 6th Arizona Territorial Legislature rescinded the act that created the county and restored the remaining portion to Mohave County.

See also
 List of former United States counties
 List of counties in Arizona

References

External links
  Official Map of the Territory Of Arizona, With All the Recent Explorations. Compiled by Richard Gird C.E. Commissioner. Approved By John N. Goodwin, Governor. In Accordance With an Act of the Legislature, Approved Oct. 23d. 1864. We hereby certify that this is the Official Map of the Territory of Arizona, and approve the same. Prescott October 12th 1865. (with signed seal dated 1863). Published By A. Gensoul, Pacific Map Depot. No. 511 Montgomery St. San Francisco. Lith. Britton & Co. San Francisco.  Accessed from www.davidrumsey.com, May 24, 2015. Shows boundaries of Pah-Ute County, location of Callville, the Pah-Ute County seat, and other landings, settlements, mining districts and counties of Arizona Territory in 1865.
 Arizona State Facts

Former counties of the United States
Arizona Territory
History of Arizona
History of Nevada
1865 establishments in Arizona Territory
1871 disestablishments in Arizona Territory
Pre-statehood history of Arizona